Coleophora confluella is a moth of the family Coleophoridae. It is found in on the Canary Islands.

The larvae feed on Cistus monspeliensis, Cistus vaginatus, Helianthemum guttatum and Tuberaria species. They create a composite leaf case, built of 2-3 leaf fragments. It has a length of 10-10.5 mm and a mouth angle of about 45°. Larvae can be found from March to April.

References

confluella
Moths described in 1892
Insects of the Canary Islands
Moths of Africa